Jeroen van Wetten (2 January 1980 in Leiderdorp) is a Dutch former professional footballer. He played in the position of forward. Van Wetten studied at the Vrije Universiteit and currently works in business intelligence.

Club history 
As a professional, he played one season for ADO Den Haag (2000–01) and two seasons for RBC Roosendaal (2001–03). He continued to VV Noordwijk (2003–05), DOTO Pernis (2005–07), ASWH (2007–08) and BVV Barendrecht (2008–12). From Barendrecht, he considered a return to RBC that had gone bankrupt and restarted as amateurs in the lower leagues. These plans fell through and he finished his football career at Barendrecht instead.

References 

1980 births
Dutch footballers
ADO Den Haag players
RBC Roosendaal players
VV Noordwijk players
BVV Barendrecht players
People from Leiderdorp
ASWH players
Living people
Vrije Universiteit Amsterdam alumni